Battle of Alkmaar may refer to:
Siege of Alkmaar
Battle of Alkmaar (1799)